Schlüter (also spelled Schlueter) is a German surname. Notable people with the surname include:

Andreas Schlüter (c. 1664–1714), German baroque sculptor and architect
Anton Schlüter München, German company
Ann-Helena Schlüter, Swedish-German musician
Anne Marie Vessel Schlüter (born 1949), Danish ballet dancer and wife of Poul Schlüter
Auguste Schlüter (1849–1917), German writer
Carina Schlüter (born 1996), German footballer
Carl Schlüter (1846–1884), German sculptor
Erna Schlüter (1904–1969), German dramatic soprano and voice teacher
Johan Schlüter (born 1944), Danish lawyer
Karin Schlüter (born 1937), German equestrian
Karl-Heinz Schlüter (1920–1995), German musician
Lasse Schlüter (born 1992), German footballer
Otto Schlüter (1872–1959), German geographer
Poul Schlüter (1929–2021), Danish politician
Torsten Schlüter (born 1959), German artist
Walter Schlüter (1911–1977), German race driver
Wilhelm Schlüter (1828–1919), German naturalist

With the spelling Schlueter:
Blake Schlueter (born 1986), American footballer
Charles Schlueter, American musician
Dale Schlueter (1945–1914), American basketball player
Frank J. Schlueter (c.1874 – 1972), American photographer
Fred W. Schlueter (1895–1969), American politician
Jay Schlueter (1949–2010), American baseball player
June Schlueter, American academic
Norm Schlueter (1916–2004), American baseball player
William Schlueter (1962-present), American tennis player

See also
Schlüter (crater), a lunar impact crater
6350 Schlüter, minor planet
Schluter
Schlyter

German-language surnames